Sebastian Grønning Andersen (born 20 August 1997) is a Danish professional footballer who plays as a forward for Super League Greece club OFI.

Club career

AaB
In 2016, At the age of 19, Grønning was promoted to the first team squad of AaB and concomitantly signed his first professional contract with the club.

Grønning made his debut for AaB on 17 July 2016. He would start on the bench, but replaced Christian Bassogog in the 66th minute of a 1–1 draw against AC Horsens in the Danish Superliga.

At the end of September 2016, Grønning suffered an injury in one of the ligaments in his ankle. This injury kept him out until about February 2017.

Hobro
On 6 July 2017, newly-promoted Danish Superliga club Hobro IK announced the signing of Grønning on a two-year deal. He left the club at the end of the 2018–19 season.

Skive
On 19 July 2019, Skive IK announced that they had signed Grønning on one-year contract. He ended the season as Skive's topscorer with 14 goals ind 31 league appearances.

Viborg FF
After a strong season with Skive, Viborg FF confirmed on 27 July 2020, that Grønning had joined the club on a three-year contract.

In his first season at the club, Viborg FF won the Danish 1st Division, securing promotion to the Danish Superliga. Grønning finished as the league top scorer with 23 goals in 32 matches, including a hattrick in the final game of the season against HB Køge.

Suwon Samsung Bluewings
On 5 January 2022, Grønning signed a two-year contract with K League 1 club Suwon Samsung Bluewings, with a one-year option. Grønning left Suwon at the end of August 2022, as his contract was terminated.

AGF
On transfer deadline day, 31 August 2022, Grønning joined Danish Superliga club AGF on a deal until June 2025. Head coach Uwe Rösler dropped Grønning from the squad for an upcoming fixture against FC Copenhagen on 13 November 2022, and did not return for the remainder of the year.

OFI
After five months in AGF, Grønning moved abroad once again, this time signing a deal with Super League Greece club OFI until June 2025.

Honours
Viborg
Danish 1st Division: 2020–21

Individual
Danish 1st Division Golden Boot: 2020–21

References

External links
 

1997 births
Living people
Sportspeople from Aalborg
Danish men's footballers
Danish expatriate men's footballers
Association football forwards
Danish Superliga players
Danish 1st Division players
AaB Fodbold players
Hobro IK players
Skive IK players
Viborg FF players
Suwon Samsung Bluewings players
Aarhus Gymnastikforening players
OFI Crete F.C. players
Expatriate footballers in South Korea
Expatriate footballers in Greece
Danish expatriate sportspeople in South Korea
Danish expatriate sportspeople in Greece